16th Street station may refer to:
 16th Street station (BMT Fifth Avenue Line), a former elevated station in New York City
 16th Street station (Oakland), a former intercity rail station
 16th Street station (Sacramento), a Sacramento RT Light Rail station
 16th Street Mission station, a BART station in San Francisco

See also
16th Street (disambiguation)